La Roque-sur-Pernes (literally La Roque on Pernes; Occitan: La Ròca de Pèrnas) is a commune in the southeastern French department of Vaucluse. In 2018, it had a population of 416.

History
After the Second World War hundreds of Banat French people from Banat, a region between Romania, Serbia and Hungary, settled in the village.

See also
Communes of the Vaucluse department

References

Communes of Vaucluse